Shantel VanSanten (born July 25, 1985) is an American actress and model. As a model, she has been featured in the magazines Teen Vogue and Seventeen. On television, she played the role of Quinn James in the CW teen drama series One Tree Hill, recurred as Detective Patty Spivot in the CW show The Flash, and stars as Julie Swagger, the wife of lead character Bob Lee Swagger on the USA Network series Shooter. On film, she has appeared in The Final Destination, You and I, and Something Wicked. From 2019 to 2022, VanSanten starred as Karen Baldwin in the Apple TV+ original science fiction space drama series For All Mankind.

Early life
VanSanten was born in Luverne, Minnesota. She is of Dutch and Norwegian descent. VanSanten was raised in Spring, Texas, where she attended Incarnate Word Academy (an all-girls college prep school) in Houston and Texas Christian University in Fort Worth, Texas. VanSanten also started her career as a model at the age of fifteen for the Page Parkes Management.

Career

VanSanten first appeared as a finalist on NBC's reality television series Sports Illustrated: Swimsuit Model Search but was eliminated in the series' first episode. In 2007, it was announced she had signed on in a film adaption of the novel t.A.T.u. Come Back. Filming took place throughout 2007 in Los Angeles and Moscow. Starring alongside Mischa Barton, the film premiered in Russia on January 25, 2011, and as You and I in the United States a year later.

In 2009, VanSanten appeared as Lori Milligan in The Final Destination, the fourth installment of the eponymous horror film franchise. That same year, VanSanten was cast as a series regular on The CW television drama series One Tree Hill in the show's seventh season. She portrayed the role of photographer Quinn James and the on screen sibling to Bethany Joy Lenz's character. VanSanten's role on the series continued until the series ninth and final season; her final appearance was in the series 187th and final episode. BuddyTV ranked her #24 on its "TV's 100 Sexiest Women of 2010" list, and #21 in 2011.

VanSanten starred as Christine in Something Wicked. The film is the last to feature actress Brittany Murphy, who portrays VanSanten's sister-in-law Susan. In the spring of 2012, VanSanten shot the film Golden Christmas 3 opposite Rob Mayes, Mark Famiglietti, Nikki DeLoach and Orson Bean in a family, romantic, holiday comedy directed by Michael Feifer. She portrayed Vera Buckley on the television series The Messengers, before its cancellation after one season. VanSanten portrayed Patty Spivot in the second season of The CW TV series The Flash based on the DC Comics character of the same name. She was Detective Joe West's (Jesse L. Martin) new protégée,  the only member of his new metahuman task force at the Central City Police Department besides Cisco Ramon (Carlos Valdes), and a love interest of Barry Allen (Grant Gustin). 

From 2016 to 2018, VanSanten co-starred in the USA Network drama series Shooter, playing Julie Swagger, the wife of lead character Bob Lee Swagger. She guest starred as Amy in the final season of the CBS television Scorpion in 2017. VanSanten played the role of Rebecca Butcher in the first two seasons of the Amazon Prime Video series The Boys. Since 2019, VanSanten has starred as Karen Baldwin in the Apple TV+ original science fiction space drama series For All Mankind. Also in 2019, she provided the voice of the character Wraith in the video game Apex Legends. In 2022, VanSanten recurred in the role of Special Agent Nina Chase, while series star Missy Peregrym was on maternity leave, during the fourth season of the CBS procedural series FBI.

Personal life
On February 9, 2021, VanSanten became engaged to actor Victor Webster after meeting on the set of Love Blossoms in 2016. They married in October 2021.

Filmography

Film

Television

Music videos
 "Fragile Bird" (2011), by City and Colour, as Distressed woman
 "Amy" (2014), by Goodie Mob, as Amy Anderson

Video games
 Apex Legends (2019), as Wraith (playable character)

References

External links
 

1985 births
21st-century American actresses
Actresses from Minnesota
Actresses from Texas
American film actresses
American people of Dutch descent
American people of Norwegian descent
American television actresses
Female models from Minnesota
Female models from Texas
Living people
People from Dallas
People from Luverne, Minnesota
People from Spring, Texas
Reality modeling competition participants
Texas Christian University alumni